Sainte-Julie (originally Sainte-Julie-de-Verchères), is an off-island suburb of Montreal, in southwestern Quebec, Canada, east of Montreal in Marguerite-D'Youville Regional County Municipality. The population as of the Canada 2021 Census was 30,045. In 2009 Sainte-Julie was called one of the best towns in which to live in Québec.

Geography
Sainte-Julie is located on the south shore of Montréal. The city is well connected to the nearby cities of Montréal and Longueuil by the highways 20 and 30

History
The territory of Sainte-Julie, was part of the parish of Sainte-Anne-de-Varennes and was informally known as "Grand Coteau". These settlers mostly came from Boucherville.

Soon residents, finding the Sainte-Anne-de-Varennes parish too far away, asked to establish their own parish in 1843. In 1850 they received authorization and built a church on land belonging to Julie Gauthier dite St-Germain, who asked that the name of the patron Sainte-Julie be given to the parish after Julia of Corsica, a virgin martyr from the fifth century A.D.

On May 6, 1851, a civil proclamation recognized the parish municipality of Sainte-Julie. In the fall of 1851, there were more than 190 families and 1,251 people in Sainte-Julie, according to the federal census.

On July 1, 1885, the city obtained the right to legally elect, its first mayor, Jules Choquet.

Sainte-Julie-de-Verchères, its full name, gained city status in 1971.

In the mid-1960s, the construction of the Quebec Autoroute 20 further stimulated the development of Sainte-Julie, which became a rapidly developing suburb south of Montreal.

Demographics 

Government
The mayor of Sainte-Julie is Mario Lemay. There are eight city councillors, all of which of members of La voix des citoyens — Équipe Mario Lemay, as of the 2021 Sainte-Julie municipal election.

Sainte-Julie is part of the federal electoral district of Montarville, which is represented by Stéphane Bergeron of the Bloc Québécois. It is also part of the provincial electoral district of Verchères, which is represented by Suzanne Dansereau of the Coalition Avenir Québec.

Education

Secondary education is provided at the public secondary school of Grand-Côteau.

The South Shore Protestant Regional School Board previously served the municipality.

Attractions

Hydro-Quebec's electricity interpretation centre, Électrium, is located in Sainte-Julie. La Vallée du Richelieu Golf Club's Verchères course is also located in the city.

Transportation
The Sainte-Julie public transit system provides commuter and local bus services.

Quebec Autoroute 20, Quebec Autoroute 30 and Quebec Route 229 cross the city.

See also
List of cities in Quebec

References

 
Cities and towns in Quebec
Incorporated places in Marguerite-D'Youville Regional County Municipality